Juan Mónaco won the first edition of the tournament, defeating Jarkko Nieminen in the final, 6–4, 6–3

Seeds
The top four seeds receive a bye into the second round.

Draw

Finals

Top half

Bottom half

Qualifying

Seeds

Qualifiers

Lucky losers
  Aljaž Bedene

Qualifying draw

First qualifier

Second qualifier

Third qualifier

Fourth qualifier

References
 Main Draw
 Qualifying Draw

2013 ATP World Tour
2013 Singles
2013 in German tennis